Mukia is a monotypic moth genus of the family Crambidae described by Hans Georg Amsel in 1954. It contains only one species, Mukia nigroanalis, described in the same article, which is found in Iran.

References

Spilomelinae
Taxa named by Hans Georg Amsel
Monotypic moth genera
Crambidae genera